Arent Schuyler DePeyster (27 June 1736 – 26 November 1822) was an American-born military officer best known for his term as commandant of the British controlled Fort Michilimackinac and Fort Detroit during the American Revolution.  Following the capture of Lieutenant-Governor General Henry Hamilton, DePeyster is often credited as being the military leader of British and Indian forces in the Western American and Canadian frontiers.

Early life

De Peyster was a native of New York City, the son of Pierre Guillaume DePeyster (1707–1785) and Cornelia Schuyler (1715–1785). His maternal grandparents were Arent Schuyler (1662–1730) and Swantje Van Duyckhuysen (1679–1724), and his paternal grandparents were Catharina de Peyster and Abraham de Peyster (1657–1728), the 20th Mayor of New York City.  His godparents were his uncles, Philip van Cortlandt (1683–1746) and Peter Schuyler (1707–1762) and his godmother was his aunt, Eva Schuyler Bayard (died 1737).

His nephew's son, Frederic de Peyster (1796–1882), was a noted New York City lawyer.  Arent was educated in London and obtained a commission as ensign in time for the Seven Years' War.

Career
De Peyster received a commission into the British Army in 1755, and joined the 50th Foot Regiment, which had been raised in America in 1748 by William Shirley, the Governor of the Province of Massachusetts Bay. In 1745, Shirley, along with de Peyster's uncle, Col. Peter Schuyler, had directed the Siege of Louisbourg against the French in today’s Nova Scotia. He next held a commission in the 51st Foot, a regiment formed by Lieutenant General Robert Napier in America, which at one point, had three Schuylers in it.

During the Seven Years' War, he served under his uncle in upper colonial New York, gaining experience at frontier American warfare.  He was captured, held as prisoner in France, and served out the war with the 8th Regiment of Foot in Germany after being exchanged.

The 8th Regiment was assigned to Canada, and DePeyster enjoyed a series of promotions.  In 1774, he was appointed commandant of Fort Michilimackinac, in present-day Mackinaw City, Michigan.  DePeyster spent the next five years at the Fort.

American Revolution
When war broke out with the United States on 19 April 1775, DePeyster recruited Native Americans from the Great Lakes region to serve the British Crown, notably the effort under General John Burgoyne in his native colony of New York.  He was rewarded with a promotion to major.

In 1779, Major DePeyster took control of Detroit. The American Indian tribes of the Northwest Territory were then hostile to the British, but DePeyster, by his tact and the adoption of conciliatory measures, entirely weaned them from the colonists, and effectively managed his American Indian allies against American militia from Pennsylvania and Kentucky. Although Great Britain ceded control of Detroit to the United States at the end of the war, Detroit remained in British control until 1796.

In November 1783, DePeyster was informed that he was promoted to Lieutenant-Colonel and was being transferred to Fort Niagara, situated at the connection of the Niagara River and Lake Ontario. However, he did not leave for Niagara until 30 May 1784, where he assumed command on 5 June 1784. In the summer of 1785, after the war’s completion, he set sail and returned to England with his Regiment and continued to serve, eventually receiving a commission as colonel, on 12 October 1793.

Later life
He retired in 1794, due to illness, and sold his lieutenant-colonelcy to an associate of John Fane, 10th Earl of Westmorland, the then Lord Lieutenant of Ireland, who had failed to pay for it ten years later.  After his retirement, DePeyster and his wife moved to Dumfries, where they settled down at Mavis Grove, a country estate.

In 1795, when England was threatened by Napoleon, he again became actively involved with the militia.  He had a large share in enlisting and drilling the 1st regiment of Dumfries volunteers, one of the original members of which was Robert Burns, the prominent Scottish poet, who dedicated to him his poem on "Life," and with whom he once carried on a poetical controversy in the columns of the Dumfries Journal. DePeyster also published Miscellanies, by an officer in 1813.

Personal life
After the Seven Years' War, he was stationed in Scotland, where he married Rebecca Blair (d. 1827), a daughter of Bryce Blair, Provost of Dumfries, and aunt to Lieutenant-Colonel Bryce McMurdo. They married in 1757, and purportedly had a happy, but childless, marriage and were seldom apart.

De Peyster died as the result of an accident on 26 November 1822 in Dumfries, Scotland. A large funeral was given in his honor, and he was buried in St Michael's Churchyard. His wife died on 20 February 1827.

Notes
Notes

Sources

 Biography at the Dictionary of Canadian Biography Online

1736 births
1822 deaths
British military personnel of the French and Indian War
British Army personnel of the American Revolutionary War
King's Regiment (Liverpool) officers
Huguenot participants in the American Revolution
Michigan in the American Revolution
People of the Province of New York
Schuyler family
De Peyster family